Dan Wasserman is an American political cartoonist for The Boston Globe. Wasserman joined the Globe in 1985. He is syndicated by Tribune Content Agency in 40 papers in the U.S., Latin America, and Europe, and is the author of two books, We've Been Framed  and Paper Cuts. Wasserman has a BA from Swarthmore College and studied at The Art Students League of New York.

References

External links
Picture of Wasserman along with his recent cartoons

American editorial cartoonists
Living people
Year of birth missing (living people)
The Boston Globe people
Place of birth missing (living people)
Swarthmore College alumni